Eagleville is a former populated place in Mineral County, Nevada that is now a ghost town.

History 
Mineral deposits were first discovered in the area by the 1870s.
Eagleville had some Mormon residents in the 1870s.
Eagleville's post office was in operation from June 1889 until March 1913.
Baryte within limestone in large quantities were examined in Eagleville in 1899, but its distance from the railroad deemed it as unprofitable to work.

The Eagleville area produced small amounts of gold and silver in 1905 and 1908-1909.  The Jim Barron mine (also known as the Baron mine) was in operation near Eagleville in the 1910s.  
The Golden Extension Mine was in production from 1915 to 1918.

Eagleville, Churchill County 
After Eagleville declined in Mineral County, in the 1910s and the 1950s it was noted that a small village was present with the same name in nearby Churchill County.

Notes

References

External links 
 Eagleville. Forgottennevada.org.
 Eagleville. Ghosttowns.com.

Mineral County, Nevada
Ghost towns in Mineral County, Nevada